Nicolás "Nico" Paz Martínez (born 8 September 2004) is a footballer currently playing as a midfielder for Real Madrid Castilla. Born in Spain, he is a youth international for Argentina.

Club career

Early life
A youth product of CD San Juan and Tenerife, Paz joined the Real Madrid's La Fábrica in 2016.

Initially starting his career as a central defender, Paz moved further up the pitch as he developed. After playing as a centre forward, he switched to the wing, where he plays for the under-19 side. He is also comfortable operating as a central midfielder or playmaker.

He made his debut for the Real Madrid's B-team in a 3–1 win over Andorra in January 2022, coming on as an 82nd minute substitute for Iván Morante.

International career
Born in Santa Cruz de Tenerife, Canary Islands, Paz is eligible to represent both Spain and Argentina at international level. He was called up to the senior Argentina national team in March 2022.

He also was called up to the Argentina under-20 side for the 2022 Maurice Revello Tournament in France.

Paz was named in Argentina's preliminary 48-man squad for the 2022 World Cup in Qatar.

Personal life
Nico is the son of former Argentine international footballer Pablo Paz.

Career statistics

Club
.

References

2004 births
Living people
Footballers from Santa Cruz de Tenerife
Citizens of Argentina through descent
Argentine footballers
Argentina youth international footballers
Spanish footballers
Spanish people of Argentine descent
Association football midfielders
Association football forwards
Primera Federación players
CD Tenerife players
Real Madrid CF players
Real Madrid Castilla footballers